Dulwich Hill was an electoral district of the Legislative Assembly in the Australian state of New South Wales, created in 1913, and named after and including the Sydney suburb of Dulwich Hill. With the introduction of proportional representation, it was absorbed into the multi-member electorate of Western Suburbs. It was recreated in 1927, but was abolished in 1968.

Members for Dulwich Hill

Election results

References

Former electoral districts of New South Wales
1913 establishments in Australia
Constituencies established in 1913
1920 disestablishments in Australia
Constituencies disestablished in 1920
1927 establishments in Australia
Constituencies established in 1927
1968 disestablishments in Australia
Constituencies disestablished in 1968